Malouf may refer to:

 Ma'luf or Malouf, a type of Andalusian classical music of the Maghreb
 David Malouf (born 1934), Australian writer
 Nick Malouf (born 1993), Australian rugby union player

See also
 Maalouf (Arabic: معلوف), an Arabic surname
 Maloof (disambiguation)